Below is a list of languages without official status (or minority languages) with at least two million speakers, ordered by the number of total speakers. Unless otherwise noted, data of speakers are incorporated from Ethnologue.

Languages with no official status

Languages with official status in their region but not country

Languages with low  regional status 

(R) = Regional status

See also 
 Lists of languages
 Official language and List of official languages
 List of official languages by country and territory
 List of languages by total number of speakers
 List of languages by number of native speakers
 List of Wikipedias

References

Sources
 Writing Systems of the World: Alphabets, Syllabaries, Pictograms (1990),  — lists official languages of the countries of the world, among other information.

Lists of languages
Language policy
 
Linguistic rights
Majority–minority relations
Sociolinguistics lists
Linguistic discrimination
Languages without official status